The 2022 Boston College Eagles women's soccer team represented Boston College during the 2022 NCAA Division I women's soccer season.  The Eagles were led by head coach Jason Lowe, in his fourth season. They played home games at Newton Campus Soccer Field.  This is the team's 42nd season playing organized women's college soccer, and their 18th playing in the Atlantic Coast Conference.

The Eagles finished 5–8–5 overall and 1–7–2 in ACC play to finish in fourteenth place.  They did not qualify for the ACC Tournament and were not invited to the NCAA Tournament.

Previous season 

The Eagles finished 7–10–1 overall and 1–9–0 in ACC play to finish in a tie for twelfth place.  They did not qualify for the ACC Tournament and were not invited to the NCAA Tournament.

Offseason

Departures

Incoming transfers

Recruiting class

Source:

Squad

Roster

Team management

Source:

Schedule

Source:

|-
!colspan=6 style=""| Exhibition

|-
!colspan=6 style=""| Non-Conference Regular season

|-
!colspan=6 style=""| ACC Regular season

Rankings

References

Boston College
Boston College
Boston College Eagles women's soccer seasons
Boston College Eagles women's soccer